"Better Than a Dream" is a song performed by the Georgian-born, British singer Katie Melua, from her fifth studio album Secret Symphony. The song was written and originally recorded by Mike Batt whose version was used as the closing credits theme of the 1990s animated series, The Dreamstone. The single was released on 9 March 2012. The song has charted in Belgium.

Track listing

Charts

Release history

References

2012 singles
Katie Melua songs
Songs written by Mike Batt
Song recordings produced by Mike Batt
2011 songs